Dallas Dupree Young (born October 25, 2006) is an American actor best known for his recurring role in The Fosters, and his starring role in the Nickelodeon sitcom Cousins for Life. In 2021, he joined the cast of the Netflix series Cobra Kai, a sequel to The Karate Kid films.

Early life
Young was born and raised in Houston, Texas. He is the son of Major League Baseball player Eric Young Sr. and his wife Beyonka Jackson. His older brother, Eric Young Jr., is also a professional baseball player. Young dreamed of becoming a professional athlete like his father and brother. He had aspirations of playing for the Colorado Rockies like they did. In addition to baseball, Young also loves basketball and football. Between the ages of 5 and 6, Young studied karate. He would later take kickboxing lessons as well. 

Though he was sure he would become a baseball player, plans changed when a neighbor encouraged Young to go into acting. Young credited shows he grew up watching such as, Family Matters, Hannah Montana and Jessie, with helping him discover his passion for acting. He later met with talent scout Diana Horner. Young was invited to attend an acting showcase in Los Angeles where he met his manager. His manager would then introduce him to an agent and Young began booking jobs immediately. He credits Denzel Washington as his biggest influence. As of 2019, Young was homeschooled to accommodate his busy work schedule.

Career
Young began acting at age 9 when he appeared in a short film. He later made his television debut in Investigation Discovery's documentary television series, Murder Among Friends. He filmed his audition on his on his manager's front lawn and he booked the gig the very next day. He would go on to appear in episodes of Shameless, The Mayor, The Good Place and The Fosters. He also landed a small role in the 2018 sci-fi film Ready Player One. In 2018, Young landed his first leading role when he was cast as Stuart in the Nickelodeon sitcom Cousins for Life, created by Kevin Kopelow and Heath Seifert. In 2019, he appeared in two episodes of ABC's Mixed-ish. Young was later cast in the Willie Aikens biopic The Royal. 

In 2020, Young appeared in an episode of the Fox drama, 9-1-1. That year, he would also book a recurring role on another Netflix series, The Big Show Show where he played a character named after singer Taylor Swift. In 2021, Young was cast in the recurring role of Kenny Payne in Netflix's critical acclaimed original series, Cobra Kai. At age 15, Young was the youngest member of the cast. Young auditioned for the role in 2020 and the process took approximately three weeks. While he grew up on the original films, Young waited until he booked the role to binge the television series which only added to his excitement. To prepare for the role, he studied martial arts and also researched Bruce Lee and Wesley Snipes to develop his technique for the fight scenes. In addition to The Royal, Young is also set to appear in the upcoming film, 1-800-Hot-Nite.

Filmography

References

External links
 

Living people
2006 births
American male television actors
American male film actors
Male actors from Houston
21st-century American male actors
African-American male actors